Cutaneous T-cell lymphoma (CTCL) is a class of non-Hodgkin lymphoma, which is a type of cancer of the immune system.  Unlike most non-Hodgkin lymphomas (which are generally B-cell-related), CTCL is caused by a mutation of T cells.  The cancerous T cells in the body initially migrate to the skin, causing various lesions to appear.  These lesions change shape as the disease progresses, typically beginning as what appears to be a rash which can be very itchy and eventually forming plaques and tumors before spreading to other parts of the body.

Signs and symptoms
The presentation depends if it is mycosis fungoides or Sézary syndrome, the most common, though not the only types.
Among the symptoms for the aforementioned types are:  enlarged lymph nodes, an enlarged liver and spleen, and non-specific dermatitis.

Cause
The cause of CTCL is unknown.

Diagnosis
A point-based algorithm for the diagnosis for early forms of cutaneous T-cell lymphoma was proposed by the International Society for Cutaneous Lymphomas in 2005.

Classification 
Cutaneous T-cell lymphoma may be divided into the several subtypes. Mycosis fungoides is the most common form of CTCL and is responsible for half of all cases. A WHO-EORTC classification has been developed.

Treatment

There is no cure for CTCL, but there are a variety of treatment options available and some CTCL patients are able to live normal lives with this cancer, although symptoms can be debilitating and painful, even in earlier stages. FDA approved treatments include the following:
 (1999) Denileukin diftitox (Ontak)
 (2000) Bexarotene (Targretin) a retinoid
 (2006) Vorinostat (Zolinza) a hydroxymate histone deacetylase (HDAC) inhibitor
 (2009) Romidepsin (Istodax) a cyclic peptide histone deacetylase (HDAC) inhibitor
 (2018) Poteligeo (mogamulizumab-kpkc)
Histone deacetylase (HDAC) inhibitors are shown to have antiproliferative and cytotoxic properties against CTCL. Other (off label) treatments include:

In 2010, the U.S. Food and Drug Administration granted orphan drug designation for naloxone lotion as a treatment for pruritus in cutaneous T-cell lymphoma to a pharmaceutical company called Elorac.

Epidemiology
Of all cancers involving lymphocytes, 2% of cases are cutaneous T cell lymphomas. CTCL is more common in men and in African-American people. The incidence of CTCL in men is 1.6 times higher than in women.

There is some evidence of a relationship with human T-lymphotropic virus (HTLV) with the adult T-cell leukemia/lymphoma subtype. No definitive link between any viral infection or environmental factor has been definitely shown with other CTCL subtypes.

See also
 Cutaneous B-cell lymphoma
 List of cutaneous conditions

References

External links 

 

Lymphoid-related cutaneous conditions
Lymphoma
Rare cancers